Benjamin Franklin "Dad" Goodell (July 12, 1843 – December 10, 1924) was a member of the Wisconsin State Assembly.

Biography
Goodell was born on July 12, 1843 in Monroe Township, Ashtabula County, Ohio. After his father died, he and his mother relocated to Montello, Wisconsin around 1850. He was an editor and publisher by trade, and he founded the Montello Express with William Cogan. He married Mary Waldref (1847–1913) in 1865, and they relocated to Portage, Wisconsin in 1878, where he worked for the Portage City Record. In 1886 he cofounded The Portage Daily Register with Sheppard S. Rockwood (1838–1905). He died of pneumonia at his daughter's home in Phoenix, Arizona on December 10, 1924.

Assembly career
Goodell was a member of the Assembly during the 1876 session. He was a Democrat.

References

People from Ashtabula County, Ohio
People from Montello, Wisconsin
People from Portage, Wisconsin
Democratic Party members of the Wisconsin State Assembly
American editors
American publishers (people)
19th-century publishers (people)
1843 births
1924 deaths